Kansas City Current is an American professional women's soccer team based in Kansas City, Kansas. It began play as an expansion team in the National Women's Soccer League (NWSL) in 2021.

History

Establishment 

Kansas City last had an NWSL team in 2017, when two-time champions FC Kansas City ceased operations and its player-related assets were transferred to expansion team Utah Royals FC. Three years later, the Royals also had to cease operations after controversies from the team's owner Dell Loy Hansen, and a Kansas City-based ownership group led by financial executives Angie and Chris Long took advantage to secure an expansion team along with the Royals' player-related assets on December 7, 2020. Brittany Mahomes, wife of NFL quarterback Patrick Mahomes, a former college soccer player at University of Texas at Tyler and fitness trainer, purchased a stake in the team as well. In January 2023, Patrick became a member of the ownership group as well.

2021–present 

The Longs named Huw Williams, former general manager of FC Kansas City, as the team's inaugural head coach. The franchise played their first season as Kansas City NWSL, playing their home matches at Legends Field in Kansas City, Kansas, but ended their first season in Kansas City with 16 points from 24 games, 14 of which were losses.

Huw Williams was relieved of duties as manager and replaced with Matt Potter for the 2022 season, but remained with the franchise as director of soccer operations until November 2022 when it was revealed he was confronted by the team's roster for disrespectful and inappropriate behavior. This came in light of the NWSL's league-wide Yates Report. In May 2022, the team hired Allison Howard as its first team president. Kansas City unveiled their new team branding as Kansas City Current for the 2022 season, and relocated their home matches to the nearby Children's Mercy Park, in Kansas City, Kansas. A team training facility opened in June 2021 and in 2022 the ownership group announced plans for their future stadium in downtown Kansas City, Missouri. The club made significant roster moves with the additions of Sam Mewis and Lynn Williams from the North Carolina Courage, and Claire Lavogez from Bordeaux. All three players would not finish the season on the roster due to season-ending injuries, the likes of which kept both Mewis and Williams from playing a single game in the regular season. The Current had a 13-match unbeaten streak in the middle of their 2022 campaign, propelling the team to their first playoff appearance in the 2022 NWSL Playoffs, and an eventual matchup against the Portland Thorns in the NWSL Championship. Portland would go on to defeat Kansas City 2–0 in the matchup.

Colors and crest 

Due to the short turnaround between the team's founding and the 2021 NWSL season, the ownership announced in January 2021 that the team would play its inaugural season under the temporary name Kansas City NWSL with temporary crest and colors; a full brand development process would take place so that a permanent team name, crest, and colors will be in place for the 2022 NWSL season.

On October 30, 2021, the team revealed its name as Kansas City Current with new crest for the 2022 season.

Kit suppliers and sponsors

Kit history

Stadium 

Kansas City played its 2021 home matches at Legends Field in Kansas City, Kansas.

The club announced in September 2021 that it would host all home matches at Children's Mercy Park beginning with the 2022 season.

In October 2021, the club unveiled plans to construct the first purpose-built stadium for North American women's professional soccer. The 11,000-seat stadium is planned to be built in Kansas City, Missouri at the Richard L. Berkley Riverfront Park with a then-estimated cost of $70 million. The project would be entirely privately financed through the ownership group, with the team signing a 50-year lease for the site at which the stadium will be located. The costs increased to an estimated $117 million in May 2022, which the club's owners attributed to construction costs and a redesign increasing the stadium's capacity to 11,500. Angie and Chris Long requested $6 million in tax credits from the state of Missouri to supplement their private funding, in part because the lease agreement prohibited them from pursuing any local tax incentives. The stadium is expected to be completed by 2024.

Supporters 
The Blue Crew, a supporters group of the defunct FC Kansas City, has continued to support the new NWSL team in Kansas City.

Broadcasting 

On June 13, 2021, CBS affiliate KCTV agreed on a multi-year deal to become the official local television partner through the 2023 season. The station and its MyNetworkTV affiliate KSMO-TV will broadcast eight matches locally in the club's inaugural season. Brad Porter will serve as the play-by-play commentator, joined by Aly Trost as the color analyst.

Kansas City Current II  
The Current founded an affiliated reserves team in the amateur Women's Premier Soccer League (WPSL) in 2022.

2022 
The team finished its first regular season atop the WPSL's Heartland Division with an 8–0–0 record, +49 goal differential on 47 total goals scored (including an opponent's forfeit), second-most in the league. In postseason play, the Current II defeated FC Milwaukee Torrent 7–0 on July 7, 2022, and then defeated Indios Denver FC 6–1 on July 16, before falling to Colorado Rapids Women 3–2 in the Central Region finals on July 17.

Players and staff

Current squad

Technical staff

Records

Head coaches 
.

Only competitive matches are counted. Includes NWSL regular season, playoffs, and Challenge Cup matches.

Attendance

Home match largest attendance 
.

Playoff match largest attendance 
.

Season attendance

See also
Sports in Kansas City

References

External links
 
 Profile at nwslsoccer.com

Kansas
Women's soccer clubs in the United States
Association football clubs established in 2020
Sports in the Kansas City metropolitan area
Soccer clubs in Kansas
2020 establishments in Kansas
 
Organizations based in Kansas City, Kansas
Sports in Kansas City, Kansas